The Northwest Territories is the most populous of Canada's three territories with 41,070 residents as of 2021 and is the second-largest territory in land area at .

According to the Cities, Towns and Villages Act (CTVA), the Hamlets Act and the Charter Communities Act (CCA), all of which were enacted in 2003, a municipality is an area within a city, town, village, hamlet or charter community that was established or continued by a legislative order. The Tlicho Community Government Act (TCGA), enacted in 2004, also considers community governments as municipal corporations alongside charter communities, cities, hamlets, towns and villages.

Yellowknife is the capital of the Northwest Territories and its only city, while Fort Simpson is its only village. Of the remaining 22 municipalities, three of them are charter communities, four are community governments of the Tlicho people, eleven are hamlets and four are towns. The CTVA, the Hamlets Act, the CCA and the TCGA stipulate governance of these municipalities.

Half of the population of the Northwest Territories resides in Yellowknife, the largest municipality in the territory at 20,340 residents. The least populous municipality is Enterprise with 75 residents.

Cities 
An application can be submitted to incorporate a community as a city under the Cities, Town and Villages Act at the request of a minimum 25 residents that are eligible electors, or at the initiative of the Minister of Municipal and Community Affairs, if the proposed city has a minimum assessed land value of $200 million or if an exception is made by the Minister. The only city in the Northwest Territories is Yellowknife.

Towns 
Like cities, an application to incorporate as a town can be submitted under the Cities, Town and Villages Act at the request of a minimum 25 residents that are eligible electors, or at the initiative of the Minister of Municipal and Community Affairs. In the case of a town however, the proposed town's minimum assessed land value must be $50 million unless an exception is made by the Minister. The Northwest Territories has four communities incorporated as towns. Hay River is the territory's largest town by population and land area with 3,169 residents and  respectively.

Villages 
The Cities, Town and Villages Act enables an application to incorporate as a village at the request of a minimum 25 residents that are eligible electors, or at the initiative of the Minister of Municipal and Community Affairs. The proposed village's minimum assessed land value must be $10 million unless an exception is made by the Minister. The only village in the Northwest Territories is Fort Simpson.

Hamlets 
At the request of a minimum 25 residents that are eligible electors, or at the initiative of the Minister of Municipal and Community Affairs, an application can be submitted to incorporate a community as a hamlet under the Hamlets Act. Unlike cities, towns and villages, the incorporation of hamlets are not conditioned by a prescribed minimum assessed land value.

Charter communities 
An application to incorporate as a community charter can be submitted under the Charter Communities Act at the request of a minimum 25 residents that are eligible electors, or at the initiative of the Minister of Municipal and Community Affairs. After consultation with community residents and groups, the application can be approved if 60% of the eligible electors vote to approve the incorporation. The Northwest Territories has three charter communities.

Tlicho community governments 
Four community governments were established through the enactment of the Tlicho Community Government Act. Behchokǫ̀ is the territory's largest community government by population and land area at 1,746 residents and  respectively. The fourth community is Whatì, the second largest by area and population (543).

List of municipalities

See also 

List of communities in the Northwest Territories
List of population centres in the Northwest Territories

Notes

References

External links 
Northwest Territories Municipal and Community Affairs